Elisir may refer to:

 Elisir (Alice album), 1987
 Elisir (Roberto Vecchioni album), 1976

See also
 Elixir (disambiguation)